Terrey Hills is a suburb of Northern Sydney, in the state of New South Wales, Australia 25 kilometres north of the Sydney central business district in the local government area of Northern Beaches Council. It is part of the Forest District and Northern Beaches region.

Terrey Hills is a very leafy suburb and in some areas semi-rural, with many people boarding their horses in the area. Terrey Hills owes its name to the two original land holders Samuel Hills and Obediah James Terrey. Obediah Terrey acquired  in 1881 and Samuel Hills owned  nearby.

The area was used by Indigenous people prior to European settlement, and rock carvings exist in some places. One set of carvings is located near Larool Road and depicts hunting scenes with kangaroos, human figures and footprints. Terrey Hills Post Office opened on 17 June 1935.

History
For the older (geological) history, Terrey Hills is noted as the "laterite capital" of the Sydney Basin for those interested in how laterite forms (which has commonly been taken as indicator of climate change, and signalling former hotter and wetter conditions).   The laterite of Terrey Hills was used for early road-making and also has been used for rock wall coastal defence at Collaroy Beach.  It is the only place in New South Wales where fossils (meagre plant fibres) have been noted in laterite. The main laterite quarry (now the Terrey Hills playing field), and a smaller one at Tumbledown Dick, are on the National Estate (a Commonwealth heritage listing) and also have been nominated to the NSW Government local-significance heritage listing which in this area is administered by the Northern Beaches Council.

A small struggle has been ongoing for years to better protect the laterite exposure at Tumbledown Dick from the announced effects of Mona Vale road widening plans. The laterite was worked during the Great Depression when Australia had one third of the workforce out of work. The Warringah Shire Quarry or 'gravel pit' at Terrey Hills was an important place for the distribution of government relief work funding. Gai Halstead in 1988 wrote a bicentennial compilation which was sponsored by Dick Smith's "Australian Geographical" organisation which was then headquartered at Terrey Hills - "The story of Terry Hills and Duffys Forest".

In this it is noted that married men were given work at the rate of two weeks on and one off, whereas the single men worked at the 'gravel pit' at the rate of one week on and two off. Apart from this work there was little other work available at the time and Ms Halstead recorded the people at Terrey Hills were generally impoverished. For a week's work digging laterite gravel with pick and shovel there was received £1.  To be paid that, they had to walk to the 'relief office' at Narrabeen. Besides digging the laterite, the relief workers based at Terrey Hills also built or improved the roads from Terrey Hills to Mona Vale, Cottage Point and Coal and Candle Creek. The area is generally poor in fossils and the only further thing of note is that a member of the local volunteer bush fire brigade found a fossil footprint in stone fallen from the bank of McCarr's Creek near the Duck Hole.

Climate
Owing to its elevation and close proximity to the ocean, as well as its extensive tree canopy cover, the weather station at Terrey Hills records the mildest temperatures of any weather station in the Greater Sydney region. Under Köppen's scheme, the suburb has a borderline humid subtropical (Cfa) and oceanic climate (Cfb) with warm summers and cool winters.

Commercial area
The shopping centre includes a Friendly Grocer supermarket, a Post Office, specialty shops and a number of restaurants and landscaping and plant suppliers.

Northern Beaches Council has its Volunteer Services Centre located in Thompson Drive. Terrey Hills is home to the Rural Fire Service (RFS), State Emergency Service (SES), Marine Rescue NSW, Citizens Radio Emergency Services Team (CREST) & the Wireless Institute Civil Emergency Network (WICEN) under the auspices of the Radio Society (MWRS).

In addition Terrey Hills has its own Rural Fire Station located in the car park adjacent to the Frank Beckman Reserve on Yulong Avenue.  The volunteer brigade is the primary fire-fighting agency for the village and is equipped to fight both bush fires and structural / car fires with a Hino Category 11 village pumper & an Izuzu Category 1 4x4 bush fire tanker, fire engines and a Toyota Hilux support vehicle.

Terrey Hills is also home to the Manly-Warringah Media Co-Operative and the Radio Northern Beaches radio stations after its relocation from Belrose in 2013.

Transport
Terrey Hills is well served by buses and is also home to the Forest Coach Lines depot.  Bus services operate to the CBD (L70 & 270), Chatswood (283 / 284), Gordon (196), Macquarie Park (197), North Sydney (260), Mona Vale (196 /197) and the special event service to Sydney Olympic Park.  The buses to Chatswood and Gordon stop at the railway stations, enabling passengers to access train services.

Mona Vale Road is the main road through Terrey Hills, connecting it to the rest of the Northern Beaches to the east, and suburbs such as Chatswood, Hornsby and North Ryde to the west.

Education
Terrey Hills is home to six schools:
 Northern Beaches Christian School
 The Sydney Japanese School
Terrey Hills Public School
Kinma School
German International School Sydney

Sport and recreation
There are also sporting facilities including two golf courses, two tennis centres with numerous courts available, and several BMX tracks where competitions and races are held. Rotary International has a branch in Terrey Hills branch, that meets regularly at one of the local restaurants. There is also a skatepark located in Terrey Oval which opened in 2018 and was built on a previous half pipe which existed until 2010.

The Manly-Warringah Radio Society (VK2MB), the local northern beaches Amateur Radio club, has its meetings at the Terrey Hills Girl Guides hall every Wednesday evening.

The Terrey Hills Wolves are the local Rugby Union Club. They play in the Sydney Suburban Rugby sixth division Meldrum Cup competition. Their clubhouse is on the club's home ground, Yulong Oval.
The local soccer team is The Belrose Terrey Hills Raiders.

Gallery

References

Suburbs of Sydney
Northern Beaches Council